The Lady from the Shanghai Cinema is a 1988 Brazilian thriller film directed by Guilherme de Almeida Prado. The film borrows some references from Hollywood films noirs of the 1940s, mainly Orson Welles' The Lady from Shanghai; its name is a play with Welles' film.

Plot
It follows Lucas (Antônio Fagundes), an estate agent who becomes fascinate by Suzana (Maitê Proença), a woman who looks almost exactly like an actress in the film he is watching. They start an affair, but she is married to Desdino, a gangster (Paulo Villaça), exposing Lucas to a criminal world of violence and corruption.

Cast
 Maitê Proença as Suzana
 Antônio Fagundes as Lucas
 Paulo Villaça as Desdino
 José Mayer as Bolívar
 José Lewgoy as Linus
 Miguel Falabella as Lana
 Jorge Dória as an old man
 Sérgio Mamberti as Stan
 Matilde Mastrangi as secretary
 Imara Reis as Carmem / Sabrina / Lila Van / Inês Helena
 John Doo as Chuang
 Júlio Calasso as Bira

Reception
At the 16th Festival de Gramado, it was elected the Best Film by jury and critic, receiving also Best Director, Best Cinematography, Best Original Score, Best Scenography, and Best Editing awards. The Lady From the Shanghai Cinema won the Best Film, Best Cinematography, Best Score, and Best Art Director at the 6th Bogota Film Festival.

References

External links

1988 thriller films
1988 films
Brazilian thriller films
Films directed by Guilherme de Almeida Prado
1980s Portuguese-language films